Yazdekan (also Romanized as Yazdekān) is a village in Rahal Rural District of the Central District of Khoy County, West Azerbaijan province, Iran. At the 2006 National Census, its population was 2,724 in 565 households. The following census in 2011 counted 2,993 people in 779 households. The latest census in 2016 showed a population of 2,437 people in 605 households; it was the largest village in its rural district.

References 

Khoy County

Populated places in West Azerbaijan Province

Populated places in Khoy County